Mount Jukes is a mountain and surrounding coastal rural locality north of Mackay in the Mackay Region, Queensland, Australia.

Geography

The mountain is located in the south-west of the locality within Pioneer Peaks National Park and the Central Mackay Coast IBRA Region. The mountains originated from volcanic activity approximately 32 million years ago.

Mount Jukes has a species of shrubs growing in its trees called the Mount Blackwood holly, a species only found in Mount Blackwood area.  The easiest route up the mountain is by gravel road that is locked.

History

See also

List of mountains in Australia

References

Jukes
Mackay Region
Coastline of Queensland
Localities in Queensland